The first 4-6-2 Pacific type locomotives appeared in Taiwan in 1912 when ALCo-Rogers delivered three simple expansion superheated 470 x 610 1600 62.2 tons Pacific type locomotives derived from Japanese Government Railways saturated type 8900 delivered earlier by ALCo-Brooks to Japan to suit the Taiwanese conditions.  They received numbers 200 - 202.  One more locomotive number 203 was delivered in 1913.  These locomotives started the Pacific era, which lasted more than sixty years in Taiwan.  Later the ALCo Pacifics became class E 200. These American-built Pacifics remained the only ones in the island up to 1935.  They hauled the most important passenger express pair of trains between Taihoku and Takao.

In 1935 five more Pacific type locomotives, this time standard Japanese Government Railways class 55 Pacifics, were added to the locomotive stock numbered 551 - 555. In 1938 four more were delivered numbered 556 - 559. When the Pacific War started on December 7, 1941, there were only 13 Pacific type locomotives working in Taiwan. The increasing wartime traffic demanded more passenger type locomotives in Taiwan. Two new Pacifics, this time Japanese Government Railways class 57, arrived in 1942 and four more in 1943. In addition, during the war the Japanese could only deliver to Taiwan some of their C11 type 1C1t-h2 tank locomotives and their general purpose class D51 1D1-h2 Mikado type locomotives.

All Pacifics survived the war. Hitachi delivered eight more class 57s (presumably as war reparations) to Taiwan Railway Administration. These were the last Pacific type locomotives to arrive in Taiwan or, then called, National China under the Chiang Kai-shek administration.  All of them were of 2C1-h2 wheel arrangement and built to  gauge.

Class E was reclassified to ET, and class C to CT under Taiwan Railway Administration.

References 

 ALCo and Japanese Locomotive builders work lists.

Taiwan
Steam locomotives of Taiwan
Railway locomotives introduced in 1912
3 ft 6 in gauge locomotives